The Jacques Deray Prize is a French film award presented annually since 2005. It celebrates the memory of the director Jacques Deray, who was known for directing many crime and thriller films. It was created by the Institut Lumière in collaboration with the Association des Amis de Jacques Deray.

History
Jacques Deray was a French filmmaker who was known for directing many crime and thriller films, including La Piscine (1969) and Borsalino (1970). Following his death in 2003, the Jacques Deray Prize was created in Lyon, the filmmaker's hometown. It was created by the Institut Lumière, of which Jacques Deray was vice-president, in collaboration with the Association des Amis de Jacques Deray, which includes Deray's widow Agnès Vincent-Deray and his daughter Laurence Deray. It has been presented annually since 2005 to celebrate his memory. As of 2016, the jury consisted of Institut Lumière president Bertrand Tavernier, chairman (délégué général) Thierry Frémaux, and members of the association. The jury selects what they consider to be the best film of the year within the "policier" crime-thriller genre of French cinema.

The winner is presented with a bronze statuette which depicts a young girl with a butterfly on her shoulder, a reference to Deray's film Butterfly on the Shoulder (1978), as well as a direct reference to the director himself who kept a similar porcelain statuette on his desk.

The winner of the Prize is announced in January or February, and it is presented a few weeks later, in February or March. In 2021, due to the COVID-19 pandemic, the announcement was not made until the beginning of March and the award ceremony was postponed to June.

Winners

References

Jacques-Deray
Awards established in 2005
2005 establishments in France